theonlyxero (born Tyler James Lyijynen; May 3, 1996) is a Detroit based hip-hop artist and songwriter.

Music
GENES1S (Mixtape) - 2013

GENES1S II (Mixtape) - 2014 

Now Or Never (Mixtape) - 2016

21 (Mixtape) - 2017

catch22 (Mixtape) - 2018

The Revenant (Single) - 2020

EXODUS (Album) - 2022

References

External links

Living people
Date of birth missing (living people)
Rappers from Michigan
People from Utica, Michigan
21st-century American rappers
Year of birth missing (living people)